The Milang tribe (alternately Millang, Malaa, or Holon) are a tribe of the Adi people of Arunachal Pradesh and nearby Jonai, in Assam, India.

Etymology
The term Milang is an exonym, used by non-members of the tribe to refer to the tribe. Members of the tribe prefer the name Malaa.

Language 
Malaa people use a language unintelligible to most of the other Adi tribes.  There have been several theories regarding this language; most Malaa maintain that they adopted their language from a people called Soi-sotem, who inhabited their lands long before Malaa settled there. The Malaa remember the Soi-sotem in their ballads as:

 Soi belu kettunge, Sotem belu kettunge.

Soi sotem were believed to come from Kalang Ade(dite), the highest peak in the land of the Milang beyond which is the land of Idu Mishmi people.

Religion
The Malaa are adherents of indigenous Donyi-Poloism, the practice of praying to the almighty Sun goddess and The Moon God. The priests, called Madar in Malaa, are popularly believed to be the intermediaries between the natural human world and Spiritual and supernatural world. Male priests are connected with act of divination while the female priests are related with healing of sickness. The priesthood is hereditary practice as it passed from generation to generation in a family. The ritual of sacrificing an animal as suggested by priest to cure a disease is called Lulu. Whenever an epidemic or disease breaks down in a village, the villagers construct a gate at the entrance of the village and a dog is sacrificed with intestines sagging out and hanged. This ritual is called Lukan.

Ayid Madar Bemmanu, a ritualistic dance is performed throughout the night in which priest bargains to appease the spirits to release the soul of diseased person and in exchange for gifts. The priest examines the chicken liver and reads omen and suggest the nature of disease and corresponding sacrifice to be made to heal the disease.

Geography
Geographically the Malaa land lies approximately between 94-95 degree N latitude and 28-29 degree E longitude in Upper Siang district.  The land of the Milangs extends to the Chage and Felo hills in the north which is land of the Idu tribe of Dibang valley. To south and the east they are bounded by the land of the Padams.

Their land is a rich source of the Aconitum plant (variously known as monk's hood or wolf's bane), the source of the powerful poison aconitine, which the Milang historically used on their spears and arrows during battle. The Anglo-Abor wars between 1835 and 1912 saw massive use of EMO (called AMU in Millang) being supplied from Peki Modi village against the invading British forces.

The principal rivers are Sidip, Yamne, Yammeng, Satamak and Chapel besides many rivulets flowing through their land.

Millang, Dalbing and Peki Modi are the important ancestral villages of the Malaa.  However, as of today they are found residing in the hills and the valleys of East Siang, Upper Siang and Lower Dibang Valley Districts of Arunachal Pradesh.

Surnames
Surnames used by Malaa are based on family lineage.  Common surnames include:

 Ayom
 Binggep
 Bitin
 Dalbong
 Daltem
 Dameng
 Gamno
 Langkam
 Lego
 Litin
 Libang
 Miew
 Modi
 Ngukir
 Ngupok
 Patuk

Malaa bearing each surname are further subdivided into several clans. For example, the Modis have the following clans:
 Kebang
 Ketin
 Rungmi
 Taruk
 Ngusang
 Miew

References

Further reading

External links 
 Ethnologue: Adi
 Research Centre for Linguistic Typology: Mark Post (fieldworker)
 BBC: Adi Tribe

Scheduled Tribes of India
Tribes of Arunachal Pradesh
Donyi-Polo communities